HD 109271 is a star in the constellation of Virgo. With an apparent magnitude of 8.05, it cannot be seen with the naked eye. Parallax measurements made by Gaia put the star at a distance of 182 light-years (56.0 parsecs) away.

HD 109271 is a typical G-type main-sequence star. It is also much older, at an age of 7.3 billion years.

In 2020, a red dwarf companion of 0.6 was found orbiting HD 109271 at projected separation 304 AU.

Planetary system
From 2003 to 2012, the star was under observance from the High Accuracy Radial Velocity Planet Searcher (HARPS).

In 2012, two eccentric hot Neptune-mass planets were deduced by radial velocity. They were published in January 2013. These are close to a 1:4 resonance. The system is like HD 69830.

A third Neptune in the Venus zone was hypothesised from the data.

References

Planetary systems with two confirmed planets
Virgo (constellation)
Durchmusterung objects
109271
061300
G-type main-sequence stars